Indro Olumets (born 10 April 1971 in Tartu) is a former Estonian footballer who played as an offensive-minded midfielder. His last years of playing professional football were in the Estonian Meistriliiga side Nõmme Kalju. After that he has played for amateur teams including JK Kaitseliit Kalev.

He has also played for major Estonian clubs such as Flora Tallinn, Tallinna Sadam, Levadia Tallinn and TVMK Tallinn.

Player qualities
He is known for his excellent passing skills, positioning and instinct for finding strikers. Thanks to these, he has a lot of assists to his name. He played a big role in Kalju's 2005 season, when the club won promotion to Esiliiga. Olumets is considered to be one of the most technical Estonian players ever.

International career
Olumets has represented the Estonia national football team 32 times and scored 2 goals, both in the 1992 Baltic Cup. He earned his first official cap at the age of 21 on 3 June 1992, when Estonia played Slovenia in a friendly match.

Coaching career
Having retired from professional football, he coached of one of the many Nõmme Kalju youth teams.

His coaching career started when he was still an active professional player, when he became the coach for a Nõmme Kalju youngsters team and the Kalju reserve team.

References

External links

1971 births
Living people
FC Flora players
FCI Levadia Tallinn players
FC TVMK players
Nõmme Kalju FC players
Soviet footballers
Estonian footballers
Estonia international footballers
Sportspeople from Tartu
Association football midfielders
JK Tervis Pärnu players
Estonian football managers
Meistriliiga players